General Paul V. Hester (born October 21, 1947) is a retired United States Air Force officer. He served as Commander, Pacific Air Forces, and Air Component Commander for the Commander, United States Pacific Command from July 2004 to November 2007. He had responsibility for Air Force activities spread over half the globe in a command that supports 55,500 Air Force personnel serving in Hawaii, Alaska, Guam, Japan and South Korea.

Military career
Hester was commissioned through the Reserve Officers' Training Corps program at the University of Mississippi. He earned his wings in December 1971 at Columbus AFB, Mississippi. A command pilot and combat veteran, Hester has more than 200 combat hours in Southeast Asia and has accumulated more than 2,900 flight hours during his career. Additionally, he served as an instructor in the A-7, F-4 and F-15 in operational and training units. Hester commanded the 94th Tactical Fighter Squadron, 18th Operations Group, 35th Fighter Wing, 53rd Wing and United States Forces Japan and 5th Air Force at Yokota Air Base. He also served as Commander, Air Force Special Operations Command in Hurlburt Field, Florida.

Hester's staff tours include duty in the Directorate of Plans, as a member of the Commander's Action Group at Headquarters Tactical Air Command, Chief of the Air Force's Legislative Liaison Office at the United States House of Representatives, Division Chief in J-5 of the Joint Staff, Joint Chiefs of Staff representative to the Organization for Security and Cooperation in Europe, and Director of Air Force Legislative Liaison for the Secretary and the Chief of Staff of the Air Force. He also served as the Air Component Commander and force provider to Joint Task Force-536 during Operation Unified Assistance in support of the South Asia tsunami relief effort.

Education
1969 Bachelor of Business Administration degree in accountancy, University of Mississippi
1970 Master of Business Administration degree in accountancy, University of Mississippi
1974 Squadron Officer School
1979 Air Command and Staff College
1980 Master's degree in military arts and science, U.S. Army Command and General Staff College, Fort Leavenworth, Kansas
1990 National War College, Fort Lesley J. McNair, Washington, D.C.
1992 Program for Senior Officials in National Security, John F. Kennedy School of Government, Harvard University, Cambridge, Massachusetts
1993 Senior Defense Fellow, Center for International Affairs, Harvard University, Cambridge, Massachusetts
1999 Executive Program for General Officers of the Russian Federation and the United States, John F. Kennedy School of Government, Harvard University, Cambridge, Massachusetts

Assignments
January 1971 – December 1971, student, pilot training, Columbus AFB, Mississippi
January 1972 – December 1972, A-7D pilot, 333rd Tactical Fighter Training Squadron, Davis-Monthan AFB, Arizona
January 1973 – July 1973, A-7D aircraft commander, 354th Tactical Fighter Squadron, Korat Royal Thai AFB, Thailand
August 1973 – August 1974, A-7D aircraft commander, 355th Tactical Fighter Wing, Davis-Monthan AFB, Arizona
September 1974 – December 1976, aide-de-camp and F-4 instructor, later, F-15 instructor, 311th, 555th and 461st Tactical Fighter Training Squadrons, Luke AFB, Arizona
January 1977 – June 1979, F-15 instructor and flight examiner, 525th Tactical Fighter Squadron, Bitburg AB, West Germany
July 1979 – July 1980, student, U.S. Army Command and General Staff College, Fort Leavenworth, Kansas
August 1980 – August 1983, action officer, Forces Division, Directorate of Plans, later, member, Commander's Action Group, Headquarters Tactical Air Command, Langley AFB, Virginia
September 1983 – November 1986, F-15 instructor and assistant operations officer, 27th Tactical Fighter Squadron, later, operations officer and Commander, 94th Tactical Fighter Squadron, Langley AFB, Virginia
December 1986 – July 1989, Chief, Legislative Liaison Office, U.S. House of Representatives, Office of the Secretary of the Air Force for Legislative Liaison, Headquarters U.S. Air Force, Washington, D.C.
August 1989 – June 1990, student, National War College, Fort Lesley J. McNair, Washington, D.C.
July 1990 – July 1992, Vice Commander, 18th Tactical Fighter Wing, later, Commander, 18th Operations Group, Kadena AB, Japan
August 1992 – June 1993, Senior Defense Fellow, Center for International Affairs, Harvard University, Cambridge, Massachusetts
July 1993 – July 1994, Chief, Weapons Technology Control Division, J-5, Joint Chiefs of Staff, Washington, D.C.
August 1994 – November 1995, Joint Chiefs of Staff representative to the Committee on Security and Cooperation in Europe, Vienna, Austria
November 1995 – February 1997, Commander, 35th Fighter Wing, Misawa AB, Japan
February 1997 – December 1997, Commander, 53rd Wing, Eglin AFB, Florida
December 1997 – August 1999, Director, Legislative Liaison, Office of the Secretary of the Air Force, the Pentagon, Washington, D.C.
September 1999 – November 2001, Commander, U.S. Forces Japan, and Commander, 5th Air Force, Yokota AB, Japan
January 2002 – July 2004, Commander, AFSOC, Hurlburt Field, Florida
July 2004 – November 2007, Commander, Pacific Air Forces, and Air Component Commander for the Commander, U.S. Pacific Command, Hickam AFB, Hawaii

Awards and decorations

Other achievements
Kappa Sigma Man of the Year – 2002
2004 Awarded the Order of the Sword

References

United States Air Force generals
Recipients of the Legion of Merit
University of Mississippi alumni
Harvard Kennedy School alumni
Living people
Recipients of the Air Medal
United States Army Command and General Staff College alumni
1947 births
Recipients of the Order of the Sword (United States)
Recipients of the Defense Superior Service Medal
Recipients of the Defense Distinguished Service Medal
Recipients of the Air Force Distinguished Service Medal